Donald Clarence Cook (April 14, 1909December 16, 1981) was chairman of the U.S. Securities and Exchange Commission between 1952 and 1953 and also served as a member from 1949 to 1953.

Cook was a resident student at the University of Michigan College of Literature, Science and the Arts in 1927.  He ultimately became chairman of American Electric Power (1962–1976) Donald C. Cook Nuclear Generating Station is named for him.

References

External links 
 

Members of the U.S. Securities and Exchange Commission
University of Michigan College of Literature, Science, and the Arts alumni
1909 births
1981 deaths
Truman administration personnel
Eisenhower administration personnel